Malak Khaled Abed Shannak (born 1 August 1998) is a Jordanian footballer who plays as a goalkeeper for Amman and the Jordan women's national team.

References 

1998 births
Living people
Jordanian women's footballers
Jordan women's international footballers
Women's association football goalkeepers
Sportspeople from Amman
Jordan Women's Football League players
Saudi Women's Premier League players